Roger D. Aycock ( 6 December 1914 – 5 April 2004) was an American author who wrote under the pseudonym Roger Dee. He primarily wrote science fiction.

Bibliography

Novels
An Earth Gone Mad (1954)
Marco 4 (Series)
Wailing Wall (1952)
Pet Farm (1954)
Control Group (1960) 
Traders Risk (2007)
Control Group (2008)
To Remember Charlie By (2010)
Clean Break (2010)
Pet Farm (2010)
The Anglers of Arz (2010)
Problem on Balak (2010) 
Let the Sky Fall (non-science fiction, 1957)

Short Stories
The Wheel Is Death (1949)
Ultimatum (1950)
Unwelcome Tenant (1950)
Slave of Eternity (1950)
Last Return (1950)
First Life (1951)
Girl from Callisto (1951)
The Watchers (1951)
Palimpsest (1951)
Grim Green World (1951) [only as by John Starr ]
Today Is Forever (1952)
The Obligation (1952)
The Reasonable People (1952)
The Star Dice (1952)
The Persuasive Man (1952)
Paradox Planet (1952)
No Charge to the Membership (1953)
Oh Mesmerist from Mimas! (1953)
The Anglers of Arz (1953)
Earthman's Choice (1953)
Guest Artist (1953)
The Minister Had To Wait (1953)
The Enemy, Time (1953)
The Springbird (1953)
Problem on Balak (1953)
Worlds Within Worlds (1953)
Clean Break (1953)
Pet Farm (1954)
The Fresh Start (1954)
Man Friday (1954)
To Remember Charlie By (1954)
Legacy (1954)
The Frogs of Mars (1954)
Tiger's Cage (1954)
The Poundstone Paradox (1954)
The Dog That Liked Carmen (1954)
The Man Who Found Out (1954)
The Interlopers (1954)
Thank You, Member (1954)
Assignment's End (1954)
Wayfarer (1955)
The Man Who Had Spiders (1956)
The Voiceless Sentinels (1956)
Travelogue (1956)
First Landing (1957)
Traders Risk (1958)
Blue Monday (1958)
Field Report (1958)
The Feeling (1961)
Inconstancy (1962)
Rough Beast (1962)
Perfect Match (1971)
Assignment's End (2010)

External links/References
 
 
 
 review of An Earth Gone Mad
 
 IBList entry
 The 30th Golden Age of Science Fiction MEGAPACK®: Roger Dee

20th-century American novelists
21st-century American novelists
American male novelists
American science fiction writers
1914 births
2004 deaths
American male short story writers
20th-century American short story writers
21st-century American short story writers
20th-century American male writers
21st-century American male writers